Fernando Paz Castillo Aristeguieta (11 April 1893 in Caracas – 30 July 1981 in Caracas), was a Venezuelan poet, literary critic, diplomat, and educator. He received the National Prize for Literature in 1967.

Partial bibliography 
La huerta de Doñana (1920)
La voz de los cuatro vientos (1931)
Signo (1937)
Entre sombras y luces (1945)
Reflexiones de atardecer (1964)
Antología poética (1969)
Entre pintores y escritores (1970)
El otro lado del tiempo (1971)
Poesías escogidas 1920-1974 (1974)
Persistencia (1975)

See also 
Venezuelan literature
List of Venezuelan writers

References 
  Fernando Paz Castillo biography
  Paz Castillo at Venezuelatuya.com
  Fundación Polar: Lenguaje para todos/La Tradición Oral PDF format.

1893 births
1981 deaths
People from Caracas
Venezuelan diplomats
Venezuelan male poets
20th-century Venezuelan poets
20th-century male writers